Andreas Messing (born 28 January 1987) is a former speedway rider from Sweden.

Speedway career
He rode in the top tier of British Speedway riding for the Coventry Bees during the 2008 Elite League speedway season. He began his British career riding for Arena Essex Hammers in 2006.

References 

1987 births
Living people
Swedish speedway riders
Coventry Bees riders
Lakeside Hammers riders